Epipagis setinalis is a moth in the family Crambidae. It is found in Taiwan.

References

Moths described in 1918
Spilomelinae